The Cedar County Courthouse in Hartington, Nebraska dates from 1891.  It was listed on the National Register of Historic Places in 1990.

Out of 18 "County Capitol" type courthouses built in Nebraska during 1888 to 1907, this one is relatively unusual for having a tower in a corner, rather than centered.

It is a Romanesque Revival-style building.  It was designed by J. C. Stitt, an untrained architect from Norfolk, Nebraska.

References

External links 
More photos of the Cedar County Courthouse at Wikimedia Commons

Courthouses on the National Register of Historic Places in Nebraska
Romanesque Revival architecture in Nebraska
Government buildings completed in 1891
Buildings and structures in Cedar County, Nebraska
County courthouses in Nebraska